Suong (UNGEGN: ,) is the capital and largest city of Tboung Khmum Province, Cambodia. It was part of Kampong Cham Province prior to its division in 2014.

References

Cities in Cambodia
Populated places in Tboung Khmum province